Chemini District is a district of Béjaïa Province, Algeria.

Municipalities
The district is further divided into 4 municipalities:
Chemini
Tibane
Souk-Oufella
Akfadou

References

Districts of Béjaïa Province